This is a list of county courthouses in Alabama.  Each of Alabama's 67 counties has a courthouse in the county seat.  Barbour, Coffee, Jefferson, Marshall and St. Clair counties have two courthouses each.

See also
List of United States federal courthouses in Alabama

References

Courthouses
Alabama
Courthouses, county